is a Japanese footballer currently playing as a forward for Roasso Kumamoto.

Career statistics

Club
.

Notes

References

External links

1996 births
Living people
Japanese footballers
Association football forwards
J3 League players
Roasso Kumamoto players